The Lanka Education and Research Network (LEARN), formerly the Lanka Experimental Academic and Research Network, is a specialized internet service provider dedicated to supporting the needs of the research and education communities within Sri Lanka. The history of the internet in Sri Lanka began with the initial proposal of the 'Lankan Experimental Academic and Research Network' (LEARN) to Sri Lankan government in 1989 by Prof. Abhaya Induruwa. In 1990 the LEARNmail was initiated and the first message was sent over LEARN was from the University of Moratuwa to the University of Colombo. In 1994, wireless links were used to create first Internet Protocol / Wide area network (IP/WAN) in Sri Lanka between University of Colombo, University of Moratuwa and Open University of Sri Lanka. Based on a proposal submitted in 1992 to Sri Lankan government, LEARN connected to the internet in 1995 opening doors to the Internet era in Sri Lanka

Today LEARN as the National Research and Education Network in Sri Lanka, connects all of the UGC funded Sri Lankan national universities, a number of public universities, higher education institutes under other ministries, the University Grants Commission, the Ministry of Higher Education, and six national research institutions. It is a private company, owned by fourteen national universities including the UGC since 2009. According to University Grants Commission, its international connectivity include a 7Gbps bandwidth to the commodity internet and a 2.5Gbps link to LEARN point of presence in Singapore. It also connects the academic, world research internet through the TEIN4 network, SingAREN, NKN, LGN,  Internet2 and Google. LEARN as the NREN forms the Sri Lankan component of the global advanced Research and Education Internet network.

Current members
The full list of current members is shown below.

Sites Connected to the LEARN Network
University Grants Commission (Sri Lanka)
Ministry of Higher Education and Highways

Universities
University of Colombo
Eastern University
University of Jaffna
University of Kelaniya
University of Moratuwa
Open University of Sri Lanka
University of Peradeniya
Rajarata University
University of Ruhuna
Sabaragamuwa University of Sri Lanka
South Eastern University of Sri Lanka
University of Sri Jayewardenepura
Uva-Wellassa University
University of the Visual and Performing Arts
Wayamba University
Bhiksu University of Sri Lanka
Buddhist and Pali University of Sri Lanka
Sri Palee Campus
Gampaha Wickramarachchi University of Indigenous Medicine
University of Vavuniya

Research Institutes
Arthur C. Clarke Institute for Modern Technologies
Industrial Technology Institute (ITI)
National Institute of Fundamental Studies (NIFS)
National Aquatic Resources Agency (NARA)
National Science Foundation (NSF)
National Engineering Research and Development Center (NERDC)

Postgraduate Institutes
Postgraduate Institute of Agriculture (PGIA)
Postgraduate Institute of Medicine (PGIM)
Postgraduate Institute of Humanities and Social Sciences (PGIHS)
Vocational Training Institutes
Sri Lanka – German Training Institute (SLGTI)
Sri Lanka Institute of Advanced Technological Education (SLIATE)
Informatics Institute of Technology

Members, but not having LEARN VPLS direct Connection
National Centre for Advanced Studies in Humanities & Social Sciences
Sri Lanka Law College
National Institute of Social Development
University of Vocational Technology
University College of Kuliyapitiya
University College of Anuradhapura
University College of Ratmalana
University College of Jaffna
Institute of Surveying and Mapping
General Sir John Kotelawala Defence University
Ocean University of Sri Lanka

See also
List of universities in Sri Lanka
Education in Sri Lanka
Sri Lankan universities

References

Internet in Sri Lanka
National research and education networks